Polisi Sports Club is a football club from Zanzibar.

Achievements
Zanzibar Premier League : 2
 2005, 2006.

Nyerere Cup : 1
 2001.

Performance in CAF competitions
CAF Champions League: 2 appearances
2006 – First Round
2007 – Preliminary Round

CAF Confederation Cup: 1 appearance
2015 – Preliminary Round

References

Football clubs in Tanzania
Zanzibari football clubs
Police association football clubs in Tanzania